Goçguly Hangulyýewiç Goçgulyýew  (born 26 May 1977) is a retired Turkmen footballer, and current assistant coach of the Altyn Asyr FK.

Club career
Graduate youth football school in Balkanabat. He began his career at the club Arkaç in 1994. Later he played for such Turkmen clubs as FC Balkan, FC Buzmeyin and Köpetdag Aşgabat. 

In 2001 played for Kazakhstan club FC Irtysh.

In 2002, he made his debut in the championship of Uzbekistan in Pakhtakor. In Pakhtakor he became four-time champion of Uzbekistan (2002, 2003, 2004, 2005). In 2006, he moved to Kazakhstan FC Kairat. Spent one season in 2007 and the second round back to Uzbekistan, where up to 2010 played for Bunyodkor Tashkent.

In 2011, he returned to his native city Balkanabad, becoming a player of FC Gara Altyn, in 2012 retired football career.

Career statistics

Club

International

Statistics accurate as of match played 28 July 2011

Honours

Team
Pakhtakor Tashkent
 Uzbek League (4): 2002, 2003, 2004, 2005
Bunyodkor
 Uzbek League (3): 2008, 2009, 2010
 Uzbekistani Cup (2): 2008, 2010

References

External links

1977 births
Living people
Turkmenistan footballers
Expatriate footballers in Kazakhstan
Turkmenistan international footballers
2004 AFC Asian Cup players
FK Köpetdag Aşgabat players
FC Irtysh Pavlodar players
Pakhtakor Tashkent FK players
FC Kairat players
Expatriate footballers in Uzbekistan
FC Bunyodkor players
Turkmenistan expatriate sportspeople in Kazakhstan
People from Balkanabat
Association football defenders